Leiothrix  is a genus of plants in the Eriocaulaceae. It is native to tropical South America.

Leiothrix affinis Silveira - Minas Gerais
Leiothrix amazonica Moldenke - Pará
Leiothrix angustifolia (Körn.) Ruhland  - Bahia
Leiothrix araxaensis Silveira - Minas Gerais
Leiothrix arechavaletae (Körn.) Ruhland - Uruguay
Leiothrix argentea Silveira - Minas Gerais
Leiothrix argyroderma Ruhland - southeastern Brazil
Leiothrix arrecta Ruhland - Minas Gerais
Leiothrix barreirensis Silveira - Minas Gerais
Leiothrix beckii (Szyszyl. ex Wawra) Ruhland - Minas Gerais, Rio de Janeiro
Leiothrix celiae Moldenke - Cerro Yutajé in Amazonas State of Venezuela
Leiothrix cipoensis Giul - Minas Gerais
Leiothrix crassifolia (Bong.) Ruhland  - Minas Gerais
Leiothrix curvifolia (Bong.) Ruhland  - Minas Gerais
Leiothrix cuscutoides Silveira - Minas Gerais
Leiothrix dielsii Ruhland - southeastern Brazil
Leiothrix distichoclada Herzog - Bahia
Leiothrix dubia Silveira - Minas Gerais
Leiothrix echinocephala Ruhland  - Minas Gerais
Leiothrix edwallii Silveira - São Paulo
Leiothrix flagellaris (Guill.) Ruhland - Minas Gerais
Leiothrix flavescens (Bong.) Ruhland - Guyana, Venezuela, Brazil, Peru, Bolivia 
Leiothrix flexuosa Silveira - Minas Gerais
Leiothrix fluitans (Mart. ex Körn.) Ruhland - Minas Gerais
Leiothrix fluminensis Ruhland - Rio de Janeiro
Leiothrix fulgida Ruhland  - Minas Gerais
Leiothrix glandulifera Silveira - Minas Gerais
Leiothrix glauca Silveira - Minas Gerais
Leiothrix gomesii Silveira - Minas Gerais
Leiothrix gounelleana Beauverd - Minas Gerais
Leiothrix graminea (Bong.) Ruhland  - Minas Gerais
Leiothrix hatschbachii Moldenke - Minas Gerais
Leiothrix heterophylla Silveira - Minas Gerais
Leiothrix hirsuta (Wikstr.) Ruhland - eastern Brazil
Leiothrix itacambirensis Silveira - Minas Gerais
Leiothrix lanifera Silveira - Minas Gerais
Leiothrix linearis Silveira - Minas Gerais
Leiothrix longipes Silveira - Minas Gerais
Leiothrix luxurians (Körn.) Ruhland - Minas Gerais
Leiothrix mendesii Moldenke - Minas Gerais
Leiothrix michaelii Silveira - Minas Gerais
Leiothrix milho-verdensis Silveira - Minas Gerais
Leiothrix mucronata (Bong.) Ruhland - Minas Gerais
Leiothrix nubigena (Kunth) Ruhland  - Minas Gerais
Leiothrix obtusifolia Silveira - Minas Gerais
Leiothrix pedunculosa Ruhland - Minas Gerais, São Paulo
Leiothrix pilulifera (Körn.) Ruhland - eastern Brazil
Leiothrix prolifera (Bong.) Ruhland - Minas Gerais
Leiothrix propinqua (Körn.) Ruhland - Minas Gerais
Leiothrix retrorsa Silveira - Minas Gerais
Leiothrix rufula (A.St.-Hil.) Ruhland - eastern Brazil
Leiothrix rupestris Giul - Minas Gerais
Leiothrix schlechtendalii (Körn.) Ruhland - Bahia
Leiothrix sclerophylla Silveira - Minas Gerais
Leiothrix sinuosa Giul - Minas Gerais
Leiothrix spergula Ruhland - Minas Gerais
Leiothrix spiralis (Bong.) Ruhland  - Minas Gerais
Leiothrix subulata Silveira - Minas Gerais
Leiothrix tenuifolia Silveira - Minas Gerais
Leiothrix tinguensis Herzog - Bahia
Leiothrix triangularis Silveira - Minas Gerais
Leiothrix trichopus Silveira - Minas Gerais
Leiothrix trifida Silveira - Minas Gerais
Leiothrix vivipara (Bong.) Ruhland  - Minas Gerais

References

Eriocaulaceae